The Bälmeten (2,416 m) is a mountain of the Glarus Alps, overlooking Erstfeld in the canton of Uri. It lies west of the Hoch Fulen, in the group north-west of the Gross Windgällen.

References

External links
Bälmeten on Hikr

Mountains of Switzerland
Mountains of the canton of Uri
Mountains of the Alps